Cisthene minuta is a moth of the family Erebidae. It was described by Arthur Gardiner Butler in 1877. It is found in Colombia.

References

Cisthenina
Moths described in 1877